The SCR-527 (Signal Corps Radio model 527) was a medium-range radar used by the United States for early warning and ground-controlled interception (GCI) during World War II.

References

Ground radars
SCR527
World War II radars